Who's Been Sleeping in My House? is an Australian factual television series aired on ABC1 on 21 November 2011, it is produced by joined up films, in association with the ABC and ScreenWest. It's presented by professional archaeologist and researcher Adam Ford. Each episode seeks to unveil hidden stories and the history of the inhabitants that formerly resided there.

References

Australian Broadcasting Corporation original programming
Australian factual television series
2011 Australian television series debuts
2013 Australian television series endings
English-language television shows